United Nations Security Council Resolution 2620 was passed by a unanimous vote on 15 February 2022, which extended through 12 March 2023 the Panel of Experts related to the committee charged with overseeing sanctions against Sudan.

See also
 List of United Nations Security Council Resolutions 2601 to 2700 (2021–present)

References

External links 

 Text of the Resolution at undocs.org

 2620
 2620
2022 in Sudan